Junsele is a locality situated in Sollefteå Municipality, Västernorrland County, Sweden with 895 inhabitants in 2010.
The village is known for its zoo, where you can see for instance white tigers. There is a small tourist bureau, health centre, cinema and library, all situated in the Municipality office area. Places of interest nearby include the small, traditional forest village of Långvattnet, itself a designated  nature reserve noted for its geological features and surrounded by fifty lakes, where most types of fishing are available.  Bird life within the reserve is also of some interest.

Location
It is located east of the Scandinavian Mountains at a relatively moderate elevation.

Climate
Junsele has a subarctic climate with large seasonal and diurnal variations. Summers are short and warm, sometimes very warm during July. Winters are extensive but less severe than in other parts of the world at such a northerly inland latitude. Cold extremes can be severe at times, with an all-time low of  during a severe January 1987 cold wave.

Sports
The following sports clubs are located in Junsele:

 Junsele IF

References 

Populated places in Sollefteå Municipality
Ångermanland